Wach is a village in east-central Poland.

Wach or WACH may also refer to:

 WACH, a Fox television affiliate in Columbia, South Carolina
 Wach (surname)
 a former radio station in Newport News, Virginia; see WACH-TV (Virginia)

See also
 Wachs